Abbas Amiri Moghaddam (May 12, 1943 – February 26, 2011) was an Iranian actor.
He made his debut in Fire in Winter in 1984. Two of his most memorable roles were the priest of the Temple of Amun in the drama series Prophet Joseph and Abu-Musa Ashari in the drama series Imam Ali. His last role in a period drama was that of Amer ibn Masud in Mokhtarnameh.

Death
On 26 February 2011, Abbas Amari died after his car crashed into a tree when the driver lost the control.

References

External links
 

1950 births
2011 deaths
20th-century Iranian male actors
Iranian male stage actors
Iranian male actors
Iranian male television actors
People from Amol